Michael Haydn's Symphony No. 10 in F major, Perger 45, Sherman 8, Sherman-adjusted 10, MH 69, is believed to have been written in Salzburg after 1774.

Scored for flute, 2 oboes, 2 bassoons, horns, 2 trumpets, timpani and strings, in four movements:

Allegro molto
Andante, in G major
Minuet and Trio (the latter in D minor)
Presto

Discography

It is included in a set of 20 symphonies on the CPO label with Bohdan Warchal conducting the Slovak Philharmonic.

References

 A. Delarte, "A Quick Overview Of The Instrumental Music Of Michael Haydn" Bob's Poetry Magazine November 2006: 34 PDF
 Charles H. Sherman and T. Donley Thomas, Johann Michael Haydn (1737 - 1806), a chronological thematic catalogue of his works. Stuyvesant, New York: Pendragon Press (1993)
 C. Sherman, "Johann Michael Haydn" in The Symphony: Salzburg, Part 2 London: Garland Publishing (1982): lxviii

Symphony 10
Compositions in D major